Poroto District is one of eleven districts of the province Trujillo in Peru.

Festivals
Regional Fair of the Pineapple it is held in the town of Poroto.

Localities
Some localities in Poroto district are:
Shirán
San Antonio
San Bartolo

References